A premonition is a feeling that some event will happen, typically a forewarning of something unwelcome.

Premonition(s) or The Premonition may also refer to:

Film and television 
 "Premonition" (Alfred Hitchcock Presents), an episode of Alfred Hitchcock Presents (1955)
 "The Premonition" (The Outer Limits), an episode of the original version of The Outer Limits (1965)
 Premonition (1947 film), a 1947 Czech film
 Premonition (1972 film), an American horror film by Alan Rudolph
 The Premonition (1976 film), an American psychological thriller starring Richard Lynch
 Premonition (2004 film), a Japanese horror film by Tsuruta Norio
 Premonition (2005 film), a TV movie starring Catherine Oxenberg
 Premonition (2006 film), a 2006 French drama film 
 Premonition (2007 film), an American drama starring Sandra Bullock

Music

Albums
 Premonition (John Fogerty album), 1998
 Premonition (The Legendary Pink Dots album), 1982
 Premonition (Paul McCandless album), 1992
 Premonition (Peter Frampton album), 1986
 Premonition (Survivor album), 1981
 Premonition (Tony MacAlpine album), 1994
 Premonition (Vampire Rodents album), 1992
 The Premonition (album), by Firewind, 2008
 Premonitions (album), by Miya Folick, 2018
 Premonitions, by Blue Stahli, 2016
 Premonitions, an EP by Jehst, 1999

Songs
 "Premonition", by Chris Kline from the soundtrack of the video game Pinball Hall of Fame: The Williams Collection, 2011
 "Premonition", by Simple Minds from Real to Real Cacophony, 1979
 "Premonition", by Symphony X from Symphony X, 1996
 "Premonition (Intro)", by Eminem from Music to Be Murdered By, 2020
 "The Premonition", by The Haunted from The Dead Eye, 2006
 "Premonition", a track from the soundtrack of the 2015 video game Undertale by Toby Fox
 "Premonition", by Reks from Grey Hairs, 2008
 "Premonition", by Joe Satriani from Black Swans and Wormhole Wizards, 2010

Other uses 
 Premonition (horse) (1950–1970), a Thoroughbred racehorse
 Premonitions (novel), a 2005 young adult novel by Jude Watson

See also 
 Premonición, a 2006 album by David Bisbal
 Premonición Live, a 2007 live album by David Bisbal